Hạ Long station is a railway station in Vietnam. It serves the town of Hạ Long, in Quảng Ninh Province. It's located in Giếng Đáy Ward, Hạ Long.

Buildings and structures in Quảng Ninh province
Railway stations in Vietnam